Wolfgang Amadeus Mozart (1756–1791) composed several masses and separate mass movements (such as Kyrie). Mozart composed most of his masses as a church musician in Salzburg:
 Masses for regular Sundays or smaller feasts belonged to the  type. In the context of Mozart's masses brevis (short) applies primarily to the duration, i.e. the whole mass ceremony took no longer than three quarters of an hour. Instrumentation for such a  would usually be limited to violins, continuo (which included the organ), and trombones doubling the choral parts of alto, tenor and bass.
Additional instruments include oboes, trumpets, timpani, and for some of them also French horns. Instead of treating each part of the mass liturgy in a continuous rendition of the text, there are repeats, fugues, and subdivisions in several movements with separate orchestral introductions.

After moving to Vienna Mozart started to compose the Great Mass in C minor, with a broad orchestration including violas and 12 wind instruments. In 1791, he started writing a Requiem mass, which was unfinished when he died and was first completed by his pupil Franz Xaver Süssmayr.

Most nicknames of the masses were later additions. The attribution to Mozart has been disputed for several masses, most of these spurious works first published by Vincent Novello from 1819.

Masses and separate parts of the Mass Ordinary

References

Sources
 Mozart's Masses with an Accompaniment for the Organ, arranged from the full score by Vincent Novello. London: Gallaway, 1819–1824
 The Three Favorite Masses, Composed by Mozart, Haydn, and Beethoven, in Vocal Score, with an Accompaniment for the Organ or Pianoforte, by Vincent Novello. London: Novello, 1850.
 Ludwig Ritter von Köchel. Chronologisch-Thematisches Verzeichniss sämmtlicher Tonwerke Wolfgang Amade Mozarts. Breitkopf & Härtel: Leipzig, 1862.

External links
Köchel's Catalog of Mozart's Works
Neue Mozart-Ausgabe website
New Mozart Edition on-line (Masses are in "Serie I: Geistliche Gesangswerke")

Masses